Natalie Ruth Sciver-Brunt (born 20 August 1992) is an English cricketer. She was the first cricketer for England to take a hat-trick in a Women's Twenty20 International match. The "Natmeg" shot is named after Sciver, from when she has hit a cricket ball through her legs during a game.

On 7 March 2021, Sciver captained the England team for the first time in international cricket, for the third WT20I match against New Zealand, after Heather Knight was ruled out of the fixture due to an injury.

On 6 September 2022, Sciver was named as England's captain for their home WT20I series against India in the absence of Heather Knight. However two days later, Sciver announced that she decided to withdraw from the series "to focus on her mental health and well being".

Early life and education
Sciver was born in Tokyo, Japan. Her mother, Julia Longbottom, a British diplomat, was based in Japan at the time of Sciver's birth, and has been the Ambassador of the United Kingdom to Japan since March 2021. Sciver's father, Richard, is a business executive. As a child, Sciver also lived in Poland, where she played in women's league football, and the Netherlands, where she played basketball.

Sciver attended Epsom College, Surrey, England, where, between 2007 and 2011, she played cricket alongside her future England teammate and fellow Test centurion Alice Davidson-Richards. She then studied sports and exercise science at Loughborough University.

Career
She began playing cricket as a teenager, and played for Surrey club side Stoke d'Abernon. She also played cricket at school, playing in the Epsom College school 1st XI for two seasons. After a period in Surrey's Academy she played for the Surrey county team and progressed to the England Women's Academy. After some successful games in the academy team, she was selected for the 2013 limited-overs series against Pakistan where she made her debut for the full England side. In a WT20I game against New Zealand, she became the first England cricketer to take an international T20 hat-trick.

She is the holder of one of the first tranche of 18 ECB central contracts for women players, which were announced in April 2014.

In April 2015, she was named as one of the England women's Academy squad tour to Dubai, where England women played their Australian counterparts in two 50-over games and two Twenty20 matches.

She, along with Heather Knight, set the highest 3rd wicket stand in the history of the Women's Cricket World Cup (213) during the 2017 edition. In the same World Cup, Sciver along with Tammy Beaumont set the highest record partnership for the 4th wicket (170) in Women's World Cup history. Sciver was a member of the winning team at the 2017 World Cup held in England. In 2018 she was named one of the five Wisden Cricketers of the Year for her part in the World Cup victory the previous summer.

In October 2018, she was named in England's squad for the 2018 ICC Women's World Twenty20 tournament in the West Indies. Following the conclusion of the tournament, she was named as the standout player in the team by the International Cricket Council (ICC).

In February 2019, she was awarded a full central contract by the England and Wales Cricket Board (ECB) for 2019. In March 2019, during the third Women's Twenty20 International (WT20I) match against Sri Lanka, Sciver scored her 1,000th run in WT20I cricket. In June 2019, the ECB named her in England's squad for their opening match against Australia to contest the Women's Ashes. In January 2020, she was named in England's squad for the 2020 ICC Women's T20 World Cup in Australia.

On 18 June 2020, Sciver was named in a squad of 24 players to begin training ahead of international women's fixtures starting in England following the COVID-19 pandemic. In June 2021, Sciver was named in England's Test and WODI squad as the vice-captain for their home series against India. In the second match of the WODI series, she took the wicket of Shikha Pandey and claimed her 50th wicket in WODIs.

In December 2021, Sciver was named in England's squad for their tour to Australia to contest the Women's Ashes. In February 2022, she was named in England's team for the 2022 Women's Cricket World Cup in New Zealand. In April 2022, she was bought by the Trent Rockets for the 2022 season of The Hundred.

In July 2022, she was named as the vice-captain of England's team for the cricket tournament at the 2022 Commonwealth Games in Birmingham, England. At the end of the 2022 season, Sciver was named the PCA Women's Player of the Year, for her two centuries during the 2022 World Cup, her maiden Test century against South Africa, and her performances during The Hundred.

One Day International centuries

Personal life
In October 2019, Sciver announced her engagement to fellow England cricketer Katherine Brunt. They were scheduled to get married in September 2020, but their wedding was postponed due to the COVID-19 pandemic. The pair married in May 2022. Both changed their last name to Sciver-Brunt when they married, and in January 2023 it was announced that the pair would both go by the name in all cricket-related instances.

See also 
 List of centuries in women's One Day International cricket

References

External links

1992 births
Living people
Sportspeople from Tokyo
England women Test cricketers
England women One Day International cricketers
England women Twenty20 International cricketers
Surrey women cricketers
Surrey Stars cricketers
Northern Diamonds cricketers
Melbourne Stars (WBBL) cricketers
Perth Scorchers (WBBL) cricketers
IPL Supernovas cricketers
Mumbai Indians (WPL) cricketers
Women's Twenty20 International cricket hat-trick takers
Wisden Cricketers of the Year
Lesbian sportswomen
English LGBT sportspeople
LGBT cricketers
Trent Rockets cricketers
Cricketers at the 2022 Commonwealth Games
Commonwealth Games competitors for England
International Cricket Council Cricketer of the Year